Hemmatabad (also Romanized as Hemmatābād) is a village in Sadeqiyeh Rural District, in the Central District of Najafabad County, Isfahan Province, Iran. At the 2006 census, its population was 141, in 41 families.

References 

Populated places in Najafabad County